Deep Heat 5 – Feed The Fever is a continuation of Telstar Records' Deep Heat compilation series released in February 1990. Containing 32 dance tracks, it continued the series' success, reaching #1 on the Compilations Chart and being awarded a UK Gold Disc for album sales in excess of 100,000 copies. As with the rest of the series, the album features dance music styles of the time including techno, acid house and hip house.

Track listing 

Disc One
Silver Bullet - "20 Seconds To Comply" (Final Conflict Mix) (3:48)
2 In A Room - "Somebody In The House Say Yeah!" (3:41)
F.P.I. Present Rich In Paradise Featuring Paolo Dini - "Going Back To My Roots" (3:19)
The Beatmasters Featuring Claudia Fontaine - "Warm Love" (Soulsonic Mix) (3:37)
K.C. Flight -  "Planet E" (3:32)
Frankie Knuckles - "Move Your Body" (3:51)
Sybil - "All Through The Night" (Good Vibrations Mix) (3:48)
Latino Rave - "Deep Heat '89" (3:48) 
The Mixmaster - "Grand Piano" (3:47)
J.D. - "Good Vibrations" (3:31)
Lee Marrow - "Pain" (3:54)
Eddie "Flashin" Fowlkes - "Goodbye Kiss" (3:39)
Shay Jones - "Time To Party" (4:11)
Homeboy - "Sunshine & Brick" (3:46)
Maurizio Pavesi Featuring Lisa Scott - "Love System" (3:29)
Reese - "The Heavens" (3:46)

Disc Two
Rob'n'Raz featuring Leila K - "Got To Get" (3:41)
Santos - "Your Wish Is My Command" (2:54)
Attillas - "Seduzieteu" (Champagne Mix) (3:21)
Lips-Kiss - "Lambada" (3:41)
Pandella - "This Way, That Way" (3:57)
The Beat Club - "Security" (Club Mix) (3:45)
TOT - "What U R" (Rhythm Mix) (3:47)
Inner City - "The Paradise Megamix" (7:03)
Adeva - "I Thank You" (3:12)
De La Soul - "Eye Know" (3:56)
Intense - "Dog A Bassline" (4:23)
92nd & 5th - "What's Done Is Done" (3:57)
John Helmer - "Deep" (3:56)
Julie X - "Believe" (3:36)
Invision - "Don't Break The Rules" (Trouble's 'Broken The Rules' Mix) (3:28)
The Menz Club - "Burn The House Down" (1989 Remix) (4:36)

Notes

1990 compilation albums
House music compilation albums
Telstar Records compilation albums